Bahamut, or Bahamoot, is a monster that lies deep below, underpinning the support structure that holds up the earth, according to Zakariya al-Qazwini.

In this conception of the world, the earth is shouldered by an angel, who stands on a slab of gemstone, which is supported by the cosmic beast (ox) sometimes called Kuyutha'(/Kuyuthan)/Kiyuban/Kibuthan (most likely from a corruption or misrendering of Hebrew לִוְיָתָן "Leviathan"). Bahamut carries this bull on its back, and is suspended in water for its own stability.

Balhūt is a variant name found in some cosmographies. In the earliest sources, the name is Lutīyā, with Balhūt given as a byname and Bahamūt as a nickname.

Orthography
Bahamūt is the spelling given in al-Qazwini (d. 1283)'s cosmography. Bahamoot is Edward Lane's transcribed spelling. Balhūt is the alternate spelling given in Yaqut al-Hamawi (d. 1229)'s geographic work and copies of Ibn al-Wardi (d. 1348)'s work.

The name is thought to derive from the biblical Behemoth. It has thus been translated as Behemot (German for "Behemoth") by Ethé. However, the original biblical Behemoth never appeared as a fish. A reshaping of its nature must have occurred in Arab storytelling, some time in the pre-islamic period. One proposed scenario is that a pair of beasts from the Bible were confused with each other; the behemoth mis-assigned to the fish, and the aquatic leviathan to the bull.

Lane's summary
Bahamut, according to Lane's abstract of a particular Islamic work on cosmography, is a giant fish acting as one of the layers that supports the earth. It is so immense "[all] the seas of the world, placed in one of the fish's nostrils, would be like a mustard seed laid in the desert." Above the fish stands a bull called Kuyootà, on the bull, a "ruby" rock, on the rock an angel to shoulder the earth. Below the Bahamut (Leviathan) is the colossus serpentine Falak.

Lane's primary Islamic source for his summary is unclear, as Lane merely refers to it ly as "the work of one of the writers above quoted".

Arabic sources

There are a number of Islamic cosmographical treatises, of more or less similar content.

There can occur certain discrepancies in Western translations, even when there are no textual differences in the Arabic. The creature, named Bahamut or Balhut in these sources, can be described as a fish or whale according to translation, since the original Arabic word hūt (حوت) can mean either. Also, the gem comprising the slab beneath the angel's feet, in Arabic yāqūt is of ambiguous meaning, and can be rendered as "ruby", or variously otherwise.

Cosmography

Qazwini group
Al-Damiri (d. 1405) on authority of Wahb ibn Munabbih was one of Lane's sources, possibly the source of his main summary. His description of "Bahmût" (French translation) matches Lane's summary down to certain key details. However, there seems to be discrepancies in using "a heap of sand" (instead of "mustard") in the size analogy.

Al-Qazwini (d. 1283)'s cosmography The Wonders of Creation on the contrary agrees with Lane on these points. However, it disagrees somewhat with Lane's description regarding what lies below the fish: water, air, then a region of darkness, and with respect to the bull's appendages. It should be cautioned that Qazwini's cosmography is known to exist in a variety of different manuscripts.

Both cosmographies provide the story as words spoken by Wahb ibn Munabbih, so the descriptions should be similar at the core. In fact, Al-Damiri's version is considered to be mere redactions of Qazwini printed onto its margins.

Yakut group

Ibn al-Wardi (d. 1348) (Kharīdat al-ʿAjā'ib, "The Pearl of Wonders") is another source used by Lane, to give variant readings. Its chapter that includes the cosmography has been deemed a copy of Yaqut al-Hamawi (d. 1229)'s Mu'jam al-Buldan, with similar wording, with some rearrangements, and very slight amounts of discrepant information.

"Balhūt" is the name of the great fish given in both Ibn al-Wardi and Yaqut.

Yakut and al-Wardi both say there is a layer of sandhill between the bull and the fish. They also describe what lies under the fish somewhat differently.

These texts connect the cosmic fish and bull with phenomena of nature, namely the waxing and ebbing of tides, maintenance of the sea-level, and earthquakes. The account which only connects concerns the bull states that its breathing causes the waxing and ebbing of the tides. And since the fish and the bull drink the water running off the earth into the sea, they counteract the tap-off causing sea-level to rise. But the beasts will eventually become engorged, when they will become agitated, or, it marks the advent of Judgment Day (Ibn al-Wardi, Yaqut).

Lives of prophets

There are two Qiṣaṣ al-anbīyāʾ ("Lives of the Prophets"), one by al-Tha'labi, known otherwise for his Tafsir al-Thalabi, the other by Muḥammad al-Kisāʾī which are considered the oldest authorities containing similar cosmographical descriptions concerning the big fish and bull.

Earthquakes
Yakut also gives the account that Iblis almost incited the whale Balhūt into causing a quake, but God distracted it by sending gnats to its eyes. Or alternatively, God had sent a sword-like fish that bedazzled and captivated the giant fish. This account is also found in al-Tha'labi's Qiṣaṣ al-anbīyāʾ, but in that version God forces the whale (Lutīyā) into submission by sending a creature that invaded through its nose and reached its brain; it also claims to be an anecdote on authority of Kaʿb al-Aḥbār (d. 650s A.D.), a convert considered the earliest informant of Jewish-Muslim tradition to Arab writers.

Although this is an instance of an Arabic tale that ascribes the origins of earthquakes to the cosmic whale/fish supporting the earth, more familiar beliefs in medieval Arab associate the earthquake with the bull, or with Mount Qaf.

Japanese folklorist  has explained that the traditional belief in the earthquake-causing bull is heavily concentrated in Arab regions (Saharan Africa, Arabian Peninsula, Pakistan, Malay), whereas the motif of "World-Fish's movement causes earthquake" is found mostly in parts of Indochina, China, and throughout Japan.

Borges
According to Jorge Luis Borges's work, the Book of Imaginary Beings (1957), Bahamut is "altered and magnified" from Behemoth and described as so immense that a human cannot bear its sight.

Borges placed Bahamut as the identity of the unnamed giant fish which Isa (Jesus) witnessed in the story of the 496th night of One Thousand and One Nights (Burton's edition). This giant fish supports a bull, the bull a rock, and the rock an angel, exactly as in the traditional Perso-Arabic medieval model of the world. Borges appropriated the description of the Bahamut from Edward Lane's Arabian Society in the Middle Ages.

In popular culture

 In the Dungeons & Dragons tabletop role-playing game, Bahamut is the dragon god of justice, and is the first instance of the name being used for a dragon.
 In the Rage of Bahamut collectible card game and its anime adaptation, Bahamut is an ancient dragon with the capability to destroy the world. In the anime, preventing or aiding Bahamut's release is the goal of most of the story's factions. This Bahamut later appears in Granblue Fantasy and Dragalia Lost.
 In the Final Fantasy video game series, Bahamut is one of the most prominent summons – monsters that can be brought into battle to fight for their summoner. It appears in almost all installments of the series, with the exception of Final Fantasy II and Final Fantasy XII, where its name is used for the game's final dungeon, Sky Fortress Bahamut.
 The album Bahamut by New York–based musical group Hazmat Modine features a song called "Bahamut" as its third track.
 Several characters from the anime series "Beyblade Burst" have used a Bahamut Bey, a defense type. It is most often depicted as a black and purple dragon with accents of teal and red.

See also
 Atlas (mythology), a rough analogue from Greek mythology
 Bahamut, a dragon god from Dungeons & Dragons
 Dandan, another large fish in Arabian mythology
 Falak
 Gaokerena the mythical white haoma tree being guarded by analogue mythical creatures
 Makara or Kar Mahi an analogue from Indo-Iranian cultural sphere

Explanatory notes

References

Cited works and general bibliography 

 
  
 ʿAjā'ib al-makhlūqāt wa gharā'ib al-mawjūdāt (عجائب المخلوقات و غرائب الموجودات), plain text redaction 
  
 
 
 
 
 
 ; translation 
 
 ; album; pdf text
 
 
 
 

Arabian legendary creatures
Persian legendary creatures
World-bearing animals